Johannes Vingboons (1616/1617 – Amsterdam, 20 July 1670)  was a Dutch cartographer and watercolourist.

Biography

Vingboons came from an artistic family. His father David Vinckboons (1576–1632) was a successful painter and, of his five brothers, Philip Vingboons and Justus Vingboons were active as architects. Johannes Vingboons remained unmarried and lived with a large part of his family in an Amsterdam house and studio on Sint Antoniesbreestraat, on the corner of Salamandersteeg, now number 64. He began to paint and draw in the making of maps, cartoons and paintings for his father.

After their father's death, the sons renovated the building to use as a publisher's and printer's and brought in their own talents too: building designs from the two architects, maps and globes from Johannes. Five of the six sons were for a short or long time active as mapmaker, working together on them. From about 1640 until his death Johannes was a mapmaker, and a watercolourist in the service of the Amsterdam map publisher Joan Blaeu.

Work
By combining his traditional expertise as a cartographer with his artistic qualities as a watercolourist, he produced water colors of exotic lands based on scrupulous research. These he based on reports and sketches that masters, helmsmen and merchants on their travels under the orders of the VOC and WIC. He made city elevations, plans, coastal profiles and sea charts, combining them until he had produced a unique series of images that gave an accurate image of a large part of the world then known to Dutch trade. For many of these areas, his are the earliest images.

Vingboons's work was unique and a sought after collector's item in its own time for rich private individuals. The largest batch, a series of 130 watercolours bound in three atlases, was bought in 1654 by queen Christina of Sweden. After her death these atlases came into the possession of Pope Alexander VIII, and now rest in the library of the Vatican. The next largest collection, more than hundred works, is in the possession of the National Archives in the Hague. A small number of watercolours are in the Medici  library in Florence. Four signed parchment world maps form part of the collection of the Nederlands Scheepvaartmuseum in Amsterdam.

A large part of his work were on show from 27 January to 15 April 2007 at the exhibition "Land in zicht! Vingboons tekent de wereld van de 17e eeuw" (Land ho!  Vingboons draws the world of the 17th century) in the Kunsthal in Rotterdam, organized in cooperation with the National Archives. The majority had never been exhibited before and never will be again, because of the images' vulnerability and small size. The three bound atlases left the Vatican papal library for the first time for the exhibition.

Sources
the works of Johannes Vingboons online in the Atlas of Mutual Heritage
Johannes Vingboons in the Nationaal Archief
Johannes Vingboons in the Kunsthal
Jacobine E. Huisken, Friso Lammertse, Het kunstbedrijf van de familie Vingboons. Schilders, architecten en kaartmakers in de gouden eeuw, Maarssen, 1989, 
Martine Gosselink, Paul Brood, Land in zicht. De wereld volgens Vingboons, Zwolle, 2007,  (exhibition catalogue)

Dutch cartographers
1616 births
1670 deaths
Dutch geographers
Dutch Golden Age painters
Dutch male painters
Painters from Amsterdam
17th-century Dutch cartographers